Cuenca – Fernando Zóbel Railway Station  is the new railway station in Cuenca, Spain, located  from the city centre. It is not to be confused with the historical train station, still in operation and located much closer to the city centre. The station is named after painter Fernando Zóbel to commemorate his links to the city. It is operated by RENFE and part of Adif and high-speed rail systems.

Facilities 
Cuenca, Spain is a popular day or weekend trip from Madrid, to which it is very well connected. On 2010 December 19 a new AVE (high-speed rail) link was established on the Madrid–Levante high-speed rail line between Madrid – Atocha station and Cuenca – Fernando Zobel station, providing travellers with frequent connections everyday, and reducing the journey time to only 50 minutes.

RENFE also operates a much cheaper, non high-speed service taking 3 hours going from Madrid (note that from Monday to Thursday, the train actually departs from the also touristic city of Aranjuez, although the Cercanías connection from Madrid to Aranjuez is included within the same ticket) and stopping at the historical station of Cuenca (much closer to the city centre, although not connected by rail to the high-speed station).

Auto-Res, a bus operator belonging to the Avanza Bus group, links Madrid to Cuenca with a 2-hour or 2:30 hour trip duration.

References

Railway stations in Castilla–La Mancha
Railway stations in Spain opened in 2010
Buildings and structures in Cuenca, Spain